

Buildings and structures

Buildings
 Alvastra pile-dwelling – circa 3000 BC in Neolithic Scandinavia
 Barbar Temple – oldest of the three temples built in 3000 BC, in present-day Bahrain
 Diraz Temple – circa 3rd millennium BCE, in present-day Bahrain
 Tepe Sialk – claimed to be the world's oldest ziggurat built in 3000 BC, in present-day Iran

See also
29th century BC
29th century BC in architecture
Timeline of architecture

References 

BC
Architecture